Julius Wolff (16 September 1834 – 3 June 1910) was a German writer and poet. He enjoyed great popularity in Germany during the Gründerzeit. He was influenced by Joseph Victor von Scheffel. Lieder composer Pauline Volkstein (1849-1925) set his texts to music.

Selected works

 Der wilde Jäger (1877)

References

External links

 
 

1834 births
1910 deaths
People from Quedlinburg
19th-century German poets
German male poets
19th-century German male writers